Bayaan is a rock band from Lahore, Pakistan. It is the winning band of Pepsi Battle of the Bands Season 3 in 2018. Appeared in Nescafe Basement, the band has performed throughout Pakistan before appearing in Pepsi Battle of the Bands. The 5-member band consists of Asfar Hussain (vocalist), Haider Abbas (bassist), Shahrukh Aslam (guitarist), Muqeet Shahzad (guitarist), and Mansoor Lashari (drummer). The band members Shahzad and Abbas knew each other for more than a decade and played together in the school band. They moved to the underground music circuit and met Mansoor Lashari. In between, Lashari and Abbas became a part of Nescafe Basement where they performed with Hussain and Aslam. Thus, Bayaan came into existence. Bayaan is managed by their bassist, Haider Abbas.

Nescafe Basement 
Bayaan started its musical journey through a popular music show in Pakistan, Nescafe Basement. With Nescafe Basement, Bayaan released a few singles in Pakistan. Post Nescafe Basement, they came together to produce their own music.

Pepsi Battle of the Bands 
Following the appearance in Nescafe Basement, Bayaan came to Pepsi Battle of the Bands Season 3 and become the winners  with Xarb being the runners up. Their album and music videos will be released soon as a part of the contract they won with the title. Bayaan returned to season 4 to perform with Season 2 winners Kashmir.

Lollywood 
Bayaan's song Nahi Milta was featured in Yalghaar.

Discography

Debut Music Album 'Suno' 
Bayaan has announced the release of their debut album ‘Suno’ on the 2nd of Feb at the illustrious Lahore Music Meet festival. The album comprises 9 songs.Through this album they pay homage to the band's collective inspirations and influences while staying distinctly Bayaan. The album has been released and distributed by rearts. The music video for the song Bekhabar was released earlier but later the song was made a part of the album.

Coke Studio Season 14 
The lead vocalist for Bayaan, Asfar Hussain featured in Coke Studio (Pakistani season 14) with Arooj Aftab for a song "Mehram", written and composed by him.

See also 
 List of Pakistani music bands

References

External links 
 Bayaan on Facebook
Official YouTube Channel

Musical groups established in 2015
Musical groups from Lahore
Pakistani musical groups
Pakistani rock music groups
2015 establishments in Pakistan